Pelle Pelle is an urban fashion brand designed by Marc Buchanan. Pelle Pelle was launched in 1978 and started as a leather outerwear company. The brand was also the first brand to launch the designer baggy pants. Pelle is based in Auburn Hills, Michigan.

The company was recently asked by some founders of hip-hop, Furious Five and Grandmaster Flash to create a leather jacket for them to wear that was studded when they were inducted in the Rock and Roll Hall of Fame. This brand is also seen in Notorious, a 2009 motion picture that chronicles the life of rap artist Biggie Smalls.

History 
Pelle Pelle is an urban fashion brand which originated in the 1970s, when the hip-hop era emerged. A revolution in fashion took the form of comfort in baggy pants and loose clothing for MCs and breakdancers. Designer Marc Buchanan specialized in creating brightly colored, highly embellished leather jackets, and branched out to sportswear and other outerwear. A cultural and stylistic shift was sparked by Pelle, who took his cue from an Italian phrase.

In 2003, Pelle Pelle was fined $40,000 by the Federal Trade Commission for placing inaccurate labels on several types of men's pants and jackets. The clothes were labeled as machine washable; however, the garments were damaged when washed.

Pelle Pelle Product Lines
In the fall of 2009, Threadless added women's handbags to their product line:

Leather 
Pelle Pelle leather jackets include a light leather jacket for spring or a heavy one for winter. Most jackets have fur trimmings. Bomber jackets made of leather are available in adult and children's sizes.

Outerwear 
The company specializes in blending urban gear with street clothes. In 1978, this clothing line catered to only men but is now producing clothing for teenagers and women, as well.

Handbags 
Pelle Pelle launched its handbag line in fall 2009.

Celebrities
Many celebrities have worn Pelle Pelle, such as 50 Cent, G Unit, Dr. Dre, Young Dre The Truth, Ludacris, Marques Colston, Usher, Dru Hill, Bobby Brown, Fat Joe,   Mario and King 810 vocalist David Gun.

Bankruptcy
The company after it's controversy in 2003, has not been in business for more than a decade. The company was expected to return in 2022 after it's closure in 2019.

References

American companies established in 1978
Clothing companies established in 1978
Companies based in Metro Detroit
Clothing retailers of the United States
Clothing brands of the United States
1978 establishments in Michigan